{|

|}

The Convair F-106 Delta Dart was the primary all-weather interceptor aircraft of the United States Air Force from the 1960s through to the 1980s. Designed as the so-called "Ultimate Interceptor", it proved to be the last specialist interceptor in U.S. Air Force service to date. It was gradually retired during the 1980s, with the QF-106 drone conversions of the aircraft being used until 1998 under the Pacer Six program.

Development

Antecedents
The F-106 was the ultimate development of the USAF's 1954 interceptor program of the early 1950s. The initial winner of this competition had been the F-102 Delta Dagger, but early versions of this aircraft had demonstrated extremely poor performance, limited to subsonic speeds and relatively low altitudes. During the testing program the F-102 underwent numerous changes to improve its performance, notably the application of the area rule to the fuselage shaping and a change of engine, and the dropping of the advanced MX-1179 fire control system and its replacement with a slightly upgraded version of the MX-1 already in use on subsonic designs. The resulting aircraft became the F-102A, and in spite of being considered barely suitable for its mission, the Air Force sent out a production contract in March 1954, with the first deliveries expected in the following year.

By December 1951 the Air Force had already turned its attention to a further improved version, the F-102B. Initially the main planned change was the replacement of the A-model's Pratt & Whitney J57 (itself replacing the original J40) with the more powerful Bristol Olympus, produced under license as the Wright J67. By the time this would be available, the MX-1179 was expected to be available, and was selected as well. The result would be the "ultimate interceptor" the Air Force wanted originally. However, while initial work on the Olympus appeared to go well, by August 1953 Wright was already a full year behind schedule in development. Continued development did not resolve problems with the engine, and in early 1955 the Air Force approved the switch to the Pratt & Whitney J75.

The J75 was somewhat larger than the J57 in the F-102A, and had greater mass flow. This demanded changes to the inlets to allow more airflow, and this led to the further refinement of using a variable-geometry inlet duct to allow the intakes to be tuned to best performance across a wide range of supersonic speeds. This change also led to the ducts being somewhat shorter. The fuselage grew slightly longer, and was cleaned up and simplified in many ways. The wing was slightly enlarged in area, and a redesigned vertical tail surface was used. The engine's 2-position afterburner exhaust nozzle was also used for idle thrust control. The nozzle was held open reducing idle thrust by 40% giving slower taxiing and less brake wear.

Production contract
A mock-up with the expected layout of the MX-1179, now known as the MA-1, was inspected and approved in December 1955. With growing confidence that the aircraft was now improving, an extended production contract for 17 F-102Bs was sent out on 18 April 1956. On 17 June, the aircraft was officially re-designated as the F-106A.

Prototype
The first prototype F-106, an aerodynamic test bed, flew on 26 December 1956 from Edwards Air Force Base, with the second, fitted with a fuller set of equipment, following 26 February 1957. Initial flight tests at the end of 1956 and beginning of 1957 were disappointing, with performance less than anticipated, while the engine and avionics proved unreliable. These problems, and the delays associated with them, nearly led to the abandoning of the program, but the Air Force decided to order 350 F-106s instead of the planned 1,000. After some minor redesign, the new aircraft, designated F-106A, were delivered to 15 fighter interceptor squadrons along with the F-106B two-seat combat-capable trainer variant, starting in October 1959.

World Speed record

On 15 December 1959, Major Joseph W. Rogers set a world speed record of 1,525.96 mph (2,455.79 km/h) in a Delta Dart at 40,500 ft (12,300 m). That year, Charles E. Myers flew the same model aircraft at 1,544 mph (2,484 km/h).

Design
The F-106 was envisaged as a specialized all-weather missile-armed interceptor to shoot down bombers. It was complemented by other Century Series fighters for other roles such as daylight air superiority or fighter-bombing. To support its role, the F-106 was equipped with the Hughes MA-1 integrated fire-control system, which could be linked to the Semi-Automatic Ground Environment (SAGE) network for ground control interception (GCI) missions, allowing the aircraft to be steered by controllers. The MA-1 proved extremely troublesome and was eventually upgraded more than 60 times in service.

Similar to the F-102, the F-106 was designed without a gun, or provision for carrying bombs, but it carried its missiles in an internal weapons bay for clean supersonic flight. It was armed with four Hughes AIM-4 Falcon air-to-air missiles (either AIM-4F/G infra-red guided missiles or semi-active radar homing (SARH)-guided (which detected reflected radar signals) AIM-4E missiles), along with a single  1.5 kiloton-warhead AIR-2 (MB-2) Genie unguided air-to-air rocket intended to be fired into enemy bomber formations. Like its predecessor, the F-102 Delta Dagger, it could carry a drop tank under each wing. Later fighters such as the McDonnell Douglas F-4 Phantom II and McDonnell Douglas F-15 Eagle carried missiles recessed in the fuselage or externally, but stealth aircraft would re-adopt the idea of carrying missiles or bombs internally for reduced radar signature.

Ejection seats 
The first ejection seat fitted to early F-106s was a variation of the seat used by the F-102 and was called the Weber interim seat. It was a catapult seat which used an explosive charge to propel it clear of the aircraft. The second seat that replaced the Weber interim seat was the Convair/ICESC (Industry Crew Escape System Committee) Supersonic Rotational B-seat, called the supersonic "bobsled", hence the B designation. It was designed with supersonic ejection as the primary criterion since the F-106 was capable of Mach-2 performance. Fighter pilots viewed high speed ejections as the most important. Seat designers viewed an ejection at low altitude and slow speed as the most likely possibility. The ejection sequence with the B-seat was quite complicated and there were some unsuccessful ejections that resulted in pilot fatalities. The third seat, that replaced the Convair B-seat, was the Weber Zero-Zero ROCAT (for Rocket Catapult) seat. High-altitude supersonic ejections were rare and ejections at relatively low altitudes and low speeds were more likely. The Weber "zero-zero" seat was satisfactory and was retrofitted to the F-106 after 1965.

Operational history

The F-106 served in the contiguous US, Alaska, and Iceland, as well as for brief periods in Germany and South Korea. The F-106 was the second highest sequentially numbered P/F- aircraft to enter service under the old number sequence (the F-111 was highest), before the system was reset under the 1962 United States Tri-Service aircraft designation system. In service, the F-106's official name, "Delta Dart," was rarely used, and the aircraft was universally known simply as "The Six."

Although contemplated for use in the Vietnam War the F-106 never saw combat, nor was it exported to foreign users. Following the resolution of initial teething problems – in particular an ejection seat that killed the first 12 pilots to eject from the aircraft  – its exceptional performance made it very popular with its pilots. After the cancellation of their own Avro Arrow, the Canadian government briefly considered purchasing the F-106C/D.

To standardize aircraft types, the USAF was directed to conduct Operation Highspeed, a flyoff competition between the USAF F-106A and the U.S. Navy F4H-1 (F-4B) Phantom, which was not only as capable as the F-106 as a missile-armed interceptor but could carry as large a bomb load as the Republic F-105 Thunderchief fighter-bomber. The Phantom was the winner but would first be used to escort and later replace the F-105 fighter-bomber in the late 1960s before replacing older interceptors in Air Defense Command in the 1970s.

The F-106 was progressively updated in service, with improved avionics, a modified wing featuring a noticeable conical camber, an infrared search and track system, streamlined supersonic wing tanks which provided virtually no degradation to overall aircraft performance, better instrumentation and features like an inflight refuelling receptacle and an arrestor hook for landing emergencies.

Air-to-air combat testing suggested "The Six" was a reasonable match for the F-4 Phantom II in a dogfight, with superior high-altitude turn performance and overall maneuverability (aided by the aircraft's lower wing loading). The Phantom had better radar – operated by an additional crewman – and could carry a load of up to four radar-guided AIM-7 Sparrow and four infrared AIM-9 Sidewinder missiles, while the AIM-4 Falcon missiles carried by the F-106 proved a disappointment for dogfighting over Vietnam. The F-4 had a higher thrust/weight ratio with superior climb, better high speed/low-altitude maneuverability and could be used as a fighter-bomber. Air combat experience over Vietnam showed the need for increased pilot visibility and the utility of a built-in gun, which had been added to the "E" variant of USAF Phantoms.

In 1972, some F-106As were upgraded in Project Six Shooter that involved fitting the F-106 with a new canopy without metal bracing which greatly improved pilot visibility. Also added was an optical gunsight and provision for a M61 Vulcan 20 mm cannon. The M61 Vulcan had 650 rounds of ammunition in the center weapons bay and it replaced the AIM-26 Super Falcon or Genie. The F-15A Eagle started replacing the F-106 in 1981, with "The Sixes" typically passed on to Air National Guard units. The F-106 remained in service in various USAF and ANG units until 1988.

Retirement and conversion into drones
Between 1 June 1983 and 1 August 1988 the Delta Darts were incrementally retired and sent to the Military Storage and Disposition Center in Arizona. When the need for a high performance Full Scaled Aerial Target Drone was required, the USAF began withdrawing Delta Darts from storage. Starting in 1986, 194 of the surviving surplus aircraft were converted into target drones and these were designated QF-106As and used for target practice vehicles under the Pacer Six Program by the Aerial Targets Squadron. The last was destroyed in January 1998. The drones were still capable of being flown as manned aircraft, such as for ferrying to a test; during the test they were flown unmanned. The QF-106 replaced the QF-100 Super Sabre drone; the last shoot down of a QF-106 (57-2524) took place at Holloman AFB on 20 February 1997 after which the QF-106 was superseded by the QF-4S and QF-4E Phantom II drone.

NASA research and test aircraft
Six F-106s were retained by NASA for test purposes through 1998. An F-106B two-seat trainer was operated by NASA Langley Research Center between 1979 and 1991. This Delta Dart was used in research programs ranging from testing supersonic engines to improving maneuverability of fighters. Between 1980 and 1986 the aircraft was modified for the purpose of lightning strike research and became known as the Lightning Strike Plane and was struck 714 times without damage. One significant modification was the replacement of the composite nose radome by a metallic radome. The aircraft was equipped with optical sensors which consisted of a video camera and a light detector. Data acquisition was performed with 1980s state of the art digital waveform recorders.

Eclipse project
NASA used six drones in its Eclipse Project which ran from 1997–1998. The Dryden Flight Research Center supported project Eclipse which sought to demonstrate the feasibility of a reusable Aerotow-launch vehicle. The objective was to tow, inflight, a modified QF-106 aircraft with a C-141A transport aircraft. The test demonstrated the possibility of towing and launching a space launch vehicle from behind a tow plane.

The Cornfield Bomber

On 2 February 1970, an F-106 of the 71st Fighter-Interceptor Squadron, piloted by Captain Gary Foust, entered a flat spin over Montana. Foust followed procedures and ejected from the aircraft. The resulting change of balance caused the aircraft to stabilize and later land "wheels up" in a snow-covered field, suffering only minor damage. The aircraft, promptly nicknamed "The Cornfield Bomber", was then sent back to base by rail, repaired and returned to service, and is now on display at the National Museum of the United States Air Force.

Variants

 F-102B: The original designation of the F-106A.
 F-106A: (Convair Model 8-24) Improved version of the F-102. Fitted with the MA-1 Integrated Fire Control System with SAGE datalink, J-75 afterburning turbojet, enlarged intake, variable-geometry inlet ramps and shortened intake ducts, refined fuselage shape, modified wings and redesigned tailfin; tailpipe fitted with a device to reduce the tendency of the jet exhaust to blow unsecured objects around while taxiing, yet allowing virtually maximum performance at high thrust settings including afterburner. Performance was deemed unsatisfactory and modifications were made. The aircraft was capable of low supersonic speeds without afterburner (but with a significant range penalty) and had a maximum altitude at least . Many were fitted with a conically-cambered wing for improved takeoff, supersonic and high-altitude flight. To improve the aircraft's range the aircraft was fitted with two streamlined external supersonic tanks that still kept the aircraft capable of sustained roll rates of 100 degrees per second. Since these tanks produced virtually no significant performance degradation they were rarely jettisoned and were routinely carried around. After 1972, many F-106s were refitted with a new canopy featuring improved visibility, improved optic sights and provision for a gunpack in the center weapons bay.
 F-106B: (Convair Model 8-27) Two-seat, combat-capable training version. Pilot and instructor are seated in tandem. Due to the extra seat, the fuselage is actually better area ruled; combined with a likely reduction in weight. Weapons configurations same as F-106A.
 NF-106B: This designation was given to two F-106Bs used as test aircraft with NASA and associated research facilities from 1966 to 1991.
 F-106C: Unbuilt version. Aircraft was intended to have the AN/ASG-18 radar and fire control system fitted originally developed for the North American XF-108 Rapier. For its time, it was the largest radar to ever be fitted to a fighter, actually requiring hydraulic actuators to turn the antenna. To accommodate this larger radar system, the nose cone was longer and of greater diameter. The design featured an improved raised canopy design featuring better visibility, canards and lengthened rectangular inlet ducts. The aircraft was to be capable of carrying one GAR-9/AIM-47A in its center bay and one AIM-26A in each side bay. At one time, the US Air Force had considered acquiring 350 of these advanced interceptors, but the F-106C/D project was cancelled on 23 September 1958. 
 F-106D: Unbuilt two-seat version of the F-106C.
 F-106X: Unbuilt version (early 1968). It would have been outfitted with canards and powered by a JT4B-22 turbojet. It was envisioned as an alternative to the Lockheed YF-12, and was to have had a fire control system with "look-down/shoot-down" capability fed by a 40-inch radar dish.
 F-106E: Unbuilt version. On 3 September 1968, Convair issued a proposal for an "improved" interceptor that was to be designated F-106E/F. It was to be compatible with the upcoming airborne warning and control systems as well as with the "over-the-horizon" radar defense network. The F-106E/F would have had a longer nose and a new and improved radar with a look-down/shoot-down tracking and missile launch capability. It would also have had a two-way UHF voice and datalink radio. It would have been capable of launching both nuclear and non-nuclear missiles, including the AIM-26 Nuclear Falcon and the AIM-47.
 F-106F: Unbuilt two-seat version of the F-106E.
 QF-106A: Converted into drones, were still capable of being flown both as manned and unmanned aircraft.
 F-106 RASCAL Project: Unbuilt version. It would have been a low cost satellite launcher.

Operators

United States Air Force

Air Defense Command / Aerospace Defense Command-cum-Tactical Air Command
2nd Fighter-Interceptor Squadron – Wurtsmith AFB (1971–1972)
5th Fighter-Interceptor Squadron – Minot AFB (1960–1985)
11th Fighter-Interceptor Squadron – Duluth AFB (1960–1968)
27th Fighter-Interceptor Squadron – Loring AFB (1959–1971)
48th Fighter-Interceptor Squadron – Langley AFB (1960–1982)
49th Fighter-Interceptor Squadron – Griffiss AFB (1968–1987)
71st Fighter-Interceptor Squadron – Richards-Gebaur AFB (1960–1971)
83rd Fighter-Interceptor Squadron – Loring AFB (1971–1972)
84th Fighter-Interceptor Squadron – Hamilton AFB (1968–1973); Castle AFB (1973–1981)
87th Fighter-Interceptor Squadron – Duluth AFB (1968–1971); K.I. Sawyer AFB (1971–1985)

94th Fighter-Interceptor Squadron – Selfridge AFB (1960–1971)
95th Fighter-Interceptor Squadron – Andrews AFB (1959–1973)
318th Fighter Interceptor Squadron – McChord AFB (1960–1983)
319th Fighter-Interceptor Squadron – Bunker Hill AFB (1960–1963) / Grissom AFB (1971–1972)
329th Fighter-Interceptor Squadron – George AFB (1960–1967)
437th Fighter-Interceptor Squadron – Oxnard AFB (1968–1968)
438th Fighter-Interceptor Squadron – Kincheloe AFB (1960–1968)
456th Fighter-Interceptor Squadron – Castle AFB (1959–1968)
460th Fighter-Interceptor Squadron – Oxnard AFB (1968–1974)
498th Fighter-Interceptor Squadron – Geiger Field (1959–1968)
539th Fighter-Interceptor Squadron – McGuire AFB (1959–1967)

Air National Guard
101st Fighter Interceptor Squadron, MA ANG – Otis ANGB (1972–1988)
119th Fighter Interceptor Squadron, NJ ANG – Atlantic City ANGB (1972–1988)
159th Fighter Interceptor Squadron, FL ANG – Jacksonville ANGB (1974–1987)
171st Fighter Interceptor Squadron, MI ANG – Selfridge ANGB (1972–1978)
186th Fighter Interceptor Squadron, MT ANG – Great Falls ANGB (1972–1987)
194th Fighter Interceptor Squadron, CA ANG – Fresno ANGB (1974–1984)

NASA

Aircraft on display

F-106A
 56-0451 – Selfridge Military Air Museum, Selfridge Air National Guard Base, Michigan.
 56-0454 – Holloman AFB, New Mexico.
 56-0459 – McChord Air Museum, McChord AFB, Washington.
 56-0460 – Minot AFB, North Dakota.
 56-0461 – K. I. Sawyer AFB Heritage Air Museum at the former K. I. Sawyer AFB / now Sawyer International Airport, Marquette, Michigan.
 57-0230 – 125th Fighter Wing, Jacksonville Air National Guard Base at Jacksonville International Airport, Florida.
 58-0774 – Hill Aerospace Museum, Hill AFB, Utah.
 58-0787 – National Museum of the United States Air Force, Wright-Patterson AFB, Dayton, Ohio.  Nicknamed the "Cornfield Bomber", this F-106 landed itself with relatively minor damage in a farmer's field after its pilot lost control and ejected.  It last served with the 49th Fighter Squadron before being brought to the museum in August 1986.
 58-0793 – Castle Air Museum at the former Castle AFB, Atwater, California.
 59-0003 – Pima Air & Space Museum, adjacent to Davis-Monthan AFB in Tucson, Arizona.
 59-0010 – Aerospace Museum of California, McClellan Airfield (former McClellan AFB), Sacramento, California.
 59-0023 – Air Mobility Command Museum, Dover AFB, Delaware.
 59-0043 – 309th Aerospace Maintenance and Regeneration Group, Davis-Monthan AFB, Arizona.
 59-0069 – Great Falls Air National Guard Base, Great Falls Airport, Montana.
 59-0086 – Pacific Coast Air Museum, Santa Rosa, California.
 59-0105 – Camp Blanding Museum, Camp Blanding Florida National Guard Joint Training Center, Middleburg, Florida.
 59-0123 – Museum of Aviation, Robins AFB, Warner Robins, Georgia.
 59-0134 – Peterson Air and Space Museum, Peterson AFB, Colorado Springs, Colorado.
 59-0137 – Evergreen Aviation & Space Museum, McMinnville, Oregon.
 59-0145 – Tyndall Air Park, Tyndall AFB, Florida.
 59-0146 – 144th Fighter Wing, Fresno Air National Guard Base, Fresno, California.

F-106B
 57-2509 – Palm Springs Air Museum, Palm Springs, California.
 57-2513 – Yanks Air Museum, Chino, California.
 57-2523 – Atlantic City Air National Guard Base, Atlantic City, New Jersey.
 57-2533 – Kelly Field Heritage Museum, Lackland AFB/Kelly Field (former Kelly AFB), Texas.
 59-0158 – Edwards AFB Century Circle, Edwards AFB, California.

NF-106B
 57-2516 – Virginia Air and Space Center / Hampton History Center, Hampton, Virginia.

Specifications (F-106A)

See also

References

Notes

Citations

Bibliography 

 Broughton, Jack. Rupert Red Two: A Fighter Pilot's Life from Thunderbolts to Thunderchiefs. Minneapolis, Minnesota: Zenith Press, 2007. .
 Carson, Don and Lou Drendel. F-106 Delta Dart in Action. Carrollton, Texas: Squadron/Signal Publications, 1974. .
 
 Drendel, Lou. Century Series in Color (Fighting Colors). Carrollton, Texas: Squadron/Signal Publications, 1980. .
 Green, William. The World's Fighting Planes. London: Macdonald, 1964.
 Jenkins, Dennis R. and Tony R. Landis. Experimental & Prototype U.S. Air Force Jet Fighters. North Branch, Minnesota: Specialty Press, 2008. .
 
 Pace, Steve. X-Fighters: USAF Experimental and Prototype Fighters, XP-59 to YF-23. St. Paul, Minnesota: Motorbooks International, 1991. .
 Peacock, Lindsay. "Delta Dart ... Last of the Century Fighters". Air International, Vol. 31, No 4, October 1986, pp. 198–206, 217. Stamford, UK: Fine Scroll.
 Taylor, Michael J. H., ed. "Convair Delta Dart". Jane's American Fighting Aircraft of the 20th Century. New York: Modern Publishing, 1995. .
 United States Air Force Museum Guidebook. Wright-Patterson AFB, Ohio: U.S. Air Force Foundation, 1975.
 Wegg, John. General Dynamic Aircraft and their Predecessors. London: Putnam, 1990. .
 Winchester, Jim, ed. "Convair F-106 Delta Dart." Military Aircraft of the Cold War (The Aviation Factfile). London: Grange Books plc, 2006. .

External links

 F-106 Delta Dart Ultimate Interceptor
 Convair F-106A Delta Dart
 Convair F-106A Delta Dart – National Museum of the United States Air Force
  AeroWeb list of surviving F-106 Delta Darts on display in the US including radio-controlled drones

Convair F-0106 Delta Dart
Aircraft first flown in 1956
F-106
Low-wing aircraft
Single-engined jet aircraft
Tailless delta-wing aircraft